Favaloro is a surname. Notable people with the surname include:

René Favaloro (1923–2000), Argentine cardiologist
Norman Joseph Favaloro (1905–1989), Australian solicitor and ornithologist